Brady James Breeze (born October 9, 1997) is an American football safety for the Detroit Lions of the National Football League (NFL). He played college football at Oregon. He is the nephew of former Oregon Ducks safety Chad Cota.

Professional career

Tennessee Titans
Breeze was drafted by the Tennessee Titans in the sixth round, 215th overall, of the 2021 NFL Draft. He signed his four-year rookie contract with Tennessee on May 17, 2021. He was placed on injured reserve on September 3, 2021. He was activated on October 19, 2021. He was waived on December 11, 2021.

Detroit Lions
On December 13, 2021 Breeze was claimed off waivers by the Detroit Lions. He was waived on August 16, 2022. He was re-signed to the practice squad on November 1, 2022. He signed a reserve/future contract on January 9, 2023.

References

External links
Tennessee Titans bio

1997 births
Living people
Players of American football from Oregon
Sportspeople from Lake Oswego, Oregon
American football safeties
Oregon Ducks football players
Tennessee Titans players
Detroit Lions players